Broken Vessels is a 1999 medical drama film directed by Scott Ziehl and written by Ziehl along with David Baer and John McMahon.  The film debuted at the Los Angeles Independent Film Festival and marked Ziehl's directorial debut.  It stars Todd Field, Jason London, Roxana Zal, Susan Traylor, and James Hong.  The film follows a rookie paramedic and his hardened drug-addicted partner as they take calls and cruise L.A. in their ambulance. Although it shares the same name as the book, it has nothing to do with the Andre Dubus essay collection of the same name.

Plot 

The film tells the story of Tom, a young man from Pennsylvania who travels to Los Angeles to start working for an ambulance company. There, he is paired with an utterly self-assured veteran named Jimmy who has apparently gone through many partners in his time. In the beginning, Tom is overwhelmed by Jimmy's competence to deal with the high-pressure job, but slowly but surely he discovers that Jimmy is not the cool and collected man he thought he was. While Jimmy seems to have everything under control on the surface, he gets through the traumatic effects of the job by heavy use of drugs and avoiding commitments. Before long Tom finds himself pulled into the same world and has to come to a decision about what direction he wants to take in his life.

Cast
 Todd Field as Jimmy Warzniak
 Jason London as Tom Meyer
 Roxana Zal as Elizabeth Capalino
 Susan Traylor as Susy 
 James Hong as Mr. Chen
 Patrick Cranshaw as Gramps
 Brent David Fraser as Jed
 Stephanie Feury as Jill

Box office
Made on a non-union shoestring budget of $600,000, it was nominated for several awards when it was shown at film festivals in 1998. Though it failed to find a legitimate theatrical distributor, eventually, the film was self-released in just two theaters over the holiday weekend of July 4, 1999 and brought in $3,722.

Critical reception
Roger Ebert of the Chicago Sun-Times gave it three stars out of four, saying "What makes the movie special is the way both lead actors find the right quiet notes for their performances."

Leonard Klady of Variety wrote "A vivid, embracing tale of life on the edge, Broken Vessels is an assured first feature with potent commercial appeal. Focused on a pair of paramedics behind the wheel of an ambulance, the film skillfully careens through the incidental and dark humor of their lives and plows forward into the bleak personal terrain that comes with the job. One of the few genuine artistic hits of the L.A. Indie Fest (the film received the fest's best picture prize), Vessels has sufficient high- octane quality to overcome the noisy, overcrowded specialized scene and carve out a respectable theatrical niche. At the center of Broken Vessels are two exceptionally compelling performances by Field and London. Despite the outward flashiness of Jimmy, Field does nothing to pump up his role; it's wonderfully nuanced work in which the most modest changes in shading wind up resonating as his dance on the edge of sanity and the law becomes complex and precarious. London works his boyish persona for all its worth and his slide from cute to sinister occurs with brilliant ease."

Kevin Thomas of the Los Angeles Times wrote "Movies don't get much more corrosive or gripping than Scott Ziehl's high-energy first feature, Broken Vessels. The actors, including the ever-reliable William Smith in a cameo, are all on the money in their portrayals in exceptionally well-drawn roles, crackling with pungent dialogue. In major, demanding roles London and Field are especially impressive.  Broken Vessels could take Ziehl far. It has that kind of kinetic energy that fuses style and theme, as Tom and Jimmy careen through L.A. streets both in answer to emergency calls and in pursuit of a fix."

Awards and nominations
At the British Independent Film Awards, the film was nominated for Best Foreign Independent Film - English Language, at the Gijón International Film Festival director Scott Ziehl was nominated for the Grand Prix Asturias award in the category of Best Feature.  Ziehl and co-producer Roxana Zal won the Audience Award in the category of Best Feature Film at the Los Angeles Independent Film Festival in 1998.

References

External links
 
 
 
 

1998 films
1998 drama films
American drama films
1998 directorial debut films
1999 drama films
1999 films
1990s English-language films
Films directed by Scott Ziehl
1990s American films